Xiakaini Aerchenghazi (() born 18 July 1995) is a Chinese speed skater of Kazakh ethnicity. He competed in the 2018 Winter Olympics.

References

1995 births
Living people
Speed skaters at the 2018 Winter Olympics
Chinese male speed skaters
Olympic speed skaters of China
Ethnic Kazakh people
21st-century Chinese people